Hobo was a Yugoslav progressive rock band formed in Zagreb in 1972. Formed and led by keyboardist Mato Došen, Hobo was a prominent act of the 1970s Yugoslav rock scene.

Band history

1972-1977
Hobo was formed in 1972 by keyboardist Mato Došen, a former member of the band Heart of Soul. The band's lineup featured, beside Došen, Saša Cavrić (bass guitar), Josip Belamarić (electric violin), Boris Trubić (percussion, vocals) and Mladen Garašić (drums).

In 1974 the band performed on the third edition of BOOM Festival, held in Tivoli Hall in Ljubljana, the recording of their song "Možda jednom" ("Maybe Once") appearing on the double live album Boom Pop Festival Ljubljana '74. In 1975 the band released their debut, self-titled album. In 1975 the band also wrote music for Nenad Puhovski's TV film Bog igre (God of Dance) and performed as the opening band on Deep Purple concert in Zagreb. During the year Došen took part in the Rock Fest '75, the gathering of the most popular Yugoslav singers of the time; besides Došen, the event featured Željko Bebek (of Bijelo Dugme), Marin Škrgatić (of Grupa Marina Škrgatića), Aki Rahimovski (of Parni Valjak), Seid Memić "Vajta" (of Teška Industrija), Boris Aranđelović (of Smak), Hrvoje Marjanović (of Grupa 220), Dado Topić (of Time) and Janez Bončina "Benč" (of September).

In 1976 Hobo published their second and last release, the 7-inch single with the songs "Žena" ("Woman") and "Ha-De-Ho". Disappointed with the lack of commercial success, Došen decided to disband Hobo in 1977.

Post breakup
After Hobo disbanded, Došen formed the band Izazov, which performed more commercial rock music, leaving the band in 1979. In 1982 he released his only solo album, Zabranjene žene (Forbidden Women), after which he dedicated himself to composing and album production. During his career he produced albums by Arsen Dedić, Mišo Kovač, Marina Perazić, Neda Ukraden, Vladimir Savčić "Čobi", Danijel Popović, Massimo Savić, Magazin and other acts. He graduated from the Zagreb Music Academy and from Department of sociology of the Zagreb Faculty of Humanities and Social Sciences. He currently resides in Spain.

Discography

Studio albums
Hobo (1975)

Singles
"Žena" / "Ha-De-Ho" (1976)

Other appearances
"Možda jednom" (Boom Pop Festival Ljubljana '74; 1974)

References

External links
Hobo at Discogs
Hobo at Prog Archives

Croatian progressive rock groups
Yugoslav progressive rock groups
Yugoslav jazz-rock groups
Musical groups established in 1972
Musical groups disestablished in 1977